William Rees Brock (February 14, 1836 – November 1, 1917) was a Canadian businessman and politician.

Born in Eramosa Township, Upper Canada, Brock was president of W. R. Brock Co., Limited which sold wholesale dry goods, woolens, and carpets. He was elected to the House of Commons of Canada in the 1900 federal election for the electoral district of Toronto Centre. A Conservative, he did not run in 1904.

References
 

1836 births
1917 deaths
Conservative Party of Canada (1867–1942) MPs
Members of the House of Commons of Canada from Ontario
Burials at St. James Cemetery, Toronto